Claire Utley (born 11 February 1979) is an English former football defender, best known for her long association with Doncaster Rovers Belles. Utley represented England five times at senior international level.

Club career

In summer 1994 three players from Doncaster Belles' double-winning team left for Liverpool Ladies. As a result, Minsthorpe High School pupil Utley was drafted into the first team as a fifteen-year-old centre-back, making her debut in a 7–1 home win against Millwall Lionesses on the opening day of the 1994–95 season. In October 1994 she featured in the FA Women's Premier League Cup final, held over from the previous season, as the Belles were beaten 4–0 by Arsenal Ladies.

Utley was nicknamed Des after Des Walker. She suffered an Anterior Cruciate Ligament injury in April 2001 and missed a year of action, returning for the Belles' 2–1 defeat to Fulham in the 2002 FA Women's Cup final. She then spent a short spell at Leeds United in 2002–03.

In 2004 Doncaster Belles suffered an exodus of players after a financial crisis, however, Utley and Vicky Exley chose to remain loyal to the club.

She joined Whitley Bay ahead of season 2010–11. After two appearances that season, Utley left the club.

International career
After breaking through at Doncaster Belles, Utley was thought likely to play for England "as sure as the sun shines on the Sahara."

Utley eventually won five caps for the senior England women's national football team.

References

1979 births
Living people
English women's footballers
England women's international footballers
Doncaster Rovers Belles L.F.C. players
Leeds United Women F.C. players
FA Women's National League players
Women's association football defenders